Víctor David Díaz Miguel (born 12 June 1988) is a Spanish professional footballer who plays for and captains Granada CF as a right-back.

Club career
Díaz was born in Seville, Andalusia. A Sevilla FC youth graduate, he made his senior debut for the reserves in the 2006–07 season, achieving promotion from the Segunda División B.

Díaz made his professional debut on 25 November 2007, starting in a 1–1 away draw against Racing de Ferrol in the Segunda División. He was regularly used until the end of his spell, suffering relegation in 2009.

Díaz moved to third-tier club Real Oviedo on 29 June 2010. On 1 September of the following year, after a failed trial at Charlton Athletic, he signed for fellow league team Celta de Vigo B.

On 14 July 2012, Díaz signed a two-year deal with CD Lugo in division two. He scored his first professional goal on 14 December of that year, netting the first in a 3–2 home win over Real Madrid Castilla.

On 16 July 2014, Díaz joined Recreativo de Huelva in the same tier. The following 17 August, after being relegated, he agreed to a two-year contract at CD Leganés. He achieved promotion to La Liga at the end of the campaign, contributing 39 appearances and one goal.

Díaz made his debut in the Spanish top flight on 22 August 2016, starting and scoring the game's only goal in a win at RC Celta de Vigo – it was also the first ever goal for the Madrid side in the competition. The following 3 July, he joined Granada CF on a two-year deal.

In June 2019, after achieving promotion to the top division, Díaz signed a new three-year contract. On 16 July of the following year, he scored a late winner at RCD Mallorca in the penultimate game of the season, relegating the hosts and putting his side in line for a UEFA Europa League place.

After an arthroscopy on his knee in October 2020, club captain Díaz was out of action; on his return to training in December, a muscular injury ruled him out for longer.

Career statistics

Club

Honours
Spain U19
UEFA European Under-19 Championship: 2007

References

External links

1988 births
Living people
Spanish footballers
Footballers from Seville
Association football defenders
La Liga players
Segunda División players
Segunda División B players
Sevilla Atlético players
Real Oviedo players
Celta de Vigo B players
CD Lugo players
Recreativo de Huelva players
CD Leganés players
Granada CF footballers
Spain youth international footballers